Richard J. Colledge is an Australian philosopher and Head of the School of Philosophy at Australian Catholic University.
He is the Chair of the Australasian Society for Continental Philosophy.
Colledge is known for his research on Heidegger and Kierkegaard.

References

External links
 Richard Colledge at ACU
 Richard Colledge, Google Scholar
 Richard Colledge, PhilPeople

Australian philosophers
Phenomenologists
Continental philosophers
Philosophy academics
Heidegger scholars
Living people
Academic staff of the Australian Catholic University
University of Queensland alumni
KU Leuven alumni
Kierkegaard scholars
Year of birth missing (living people)
Philosophers of religion
Hermeneutists
Presidents of the Australasian Society for Continental Philosophy